Sea of Greed (Thai: ทะเลริษยา; RTGS: Thale Ritsaya) is a Thai television drama, premiered on November 23, 2006 and last aired on January 24, 2007 on Channel 5. It starred Namthip Jongrachatawiboon and Nawat Kulrattanarak.

Summary
In Bangkok 1984, Dujdao (Karnjana Jindawat) and Ekarin (Nirut Sirijanya) are rich owners of a hotel. One of their servants are Pavinee (Sinjai Plengpanich) who is a poor woman with a son, making her jealous of their wealth. One day, when Dujdao and Ekarin on a boat, a huge storm passes by. Pavinee tries to help Dujdao, until Pavinee drops her and the baby in the sea. However, Dujdao and the baby is still alive and they now live with a fisherman named Naengnin (Kriengkrai Unhanan) and his son Sai Lom (Puri Hiranpruk), Dujdao lives with them under the new name Khimut. After the boat incident, Pavinee tells Ekarin that Dujdao and the baby died on the boat, and Pavinee becomes the concubine of Ekarin.
Twenty-five years later, Pavinee's son, Pat (Nawat Kulrattanarak) moves into the resort and Dujdao's baby, Fah Sai (Namthip Jongrachatawiboon) now works Ekarin's hotel, unaware to Ekarin that she is his biological daughter, though he treats her like one. Pavinee becomes suspicious about this. They begin to find out about the truth and Pavinee stills to take everything and figures out that Dujdao is still alive and tries to stop Fah Sai from falling in love with Pat.

Cast
Sinjai Plengpanich as Pavinee
Nawat Kulrattanarak as Pat
Namthip Jongrachatawiboon as Fah Sai
Puri Hiranpruk as Sai Lom
Nithichai Yotamornsunthorn as Wangwit
Karnjana Jindawat as Dujdao/Khimut
Ranya Siyanon as Tikana
Nutanone Geyadiradathani as Tinut
Nirut Sirijanya as Ekarin
Kriengkrai Unhanan as Naengnin

References

Thai drama television series